Backhand (Greg Mattingly) is a fictional character, a superhero appearing in American comic books published by Marvel Comics. The character is usually depicted as a member of the Strikeforce: Morituri. The character was created by Peter B. Gillis and Brent Anderson.

Publication history
Backhand (Greg Mattingly) was created by writer Peter B. Gillis and artist Brent Anderson. He debuted as a guest character in Strikeforce: Morituri #4 (March 1987). He re-emerged in Strikeforce: Morituri #13 as a superhero and member of Strikeforce: Morituri, with the codename "Backhand", thus joining the cast of the book, until his death in issue #22.

Fictional character biography
In 2073, Greg Mattingly was a successful character who was hired in a soap opera that would depict the adventures of Strikeforce: Morituri, an internationally hailed team of new superheroes who were assigned to defend the Earth from the regular attacks of the savage alien race known as the Horde. The members of the team had acquired their powers through a complex scientific process, albeit at a terrible price: their lifespan was significantly reduced, due to an inescapable flaw in the process, which ensured their death within a year after taking the process.

Before the video series detailing the adventures of the Morituri debuted, the actors and crew of the series met the actual Morituri in a special party that took place in New York City. Mattingly introduced himself to the team member he would portray, unofficial team leader Vyking. Vyking immediately joked on how Mattingly should have landed a part that would last longer, hinting at his own brief time left on the Earth, due to the deadly Morituri effect. His attempt at black humor caused an awkward moment, which Mattingly managed to overcome.

His meeting with the Morituri proved to be a turning point in Mattingly's life. Sometime later, Mattingly was tested and found genetically compatible to undergo the Morituri process, one of the precious few that met the biological criteria (about 5% of the entire population). This development, in conjunction with Mattingly being impressed by the self-sacrifice and cause of the Morituri and the inevitable death of Vyking, contributed in his making the decision to volunteer to become a Morituri.

Through the process, Mattingly, ironically enough, developed an ability eerily similar to the one of Vyking, the Morituri he depicted in the series, namely, the ability to redirect energy. His control of energy rerouting was also more refined and focused than the one Vyking had in his own powers. In the first official mission of the new generation of Morituri, however, one of the new members, Wildcard suffered a horrible death, due to the Morituri effect. Witnessing this, Backhand freaked out and went screaming, arguing he no longer wanted to be a Morituri. However, he managed to eventually regain his calmness.

Backhand went through many adventures with the team, being part of the third generation of Morituri. Months later, during an attack by Super Hordians (an evolved form of Hordians) against a TV station, the Morituri appeared to meet their match. Backhand himself was mortally injured by them. While dying, Backhand managed to will himself to the Morituri effect and exploded, thus killing several of the Super Hordians that were near him, and providing his teammates with a fighting chance.

References

Comics characters introduced in 1987
Marvel Comics characters with superhuman strength
Marvel Comics male superheroes
Marvel Comics superheroes
Strikeforce: Morituri